Hedemora is a town in Dalarna County and the seat of Hedemora Municipality, Sweden, with 7,273 inhabitants in 2010.

Despite its small population, Hedemora is for historical reasons normally still referred to as a city, and as such the oldest in the county. 

Jonas Nilsson comes from Hedemora, as well as Kerstin Thorborg, Martin Matsbo, Bertil Norman and Ulf Stenlund.

Hedemora is the home of Clifftop Games, an independent game developer whose published works include Kathy Rain and Whispers of a Machine, and also of Killmonday Games, the independent game developer that produced the games Fran Bow and Little Misfortune.

History 

The town Hedemora was chartered in 1446, which means it is the oldest and only medieval town in Dalarna.

In 1754 and 1849 the town was severely hit by fire. The fire in 1754 destroyed 90 out of the 110 house lots in the town, including all the grain storages. However, the massive destruction made it possible to modernize the town structure, with straighter blocks and streets.

Hedemora held Gustav I of Sweden's first mint, in use 1521–1524.

In 1958, a motor racing circuit laid out in the city hosted the first Swedish motorcycle Grand Prix of MotoGP.

See also 
 Hedemora gammelgård
 Mas (Swedish term)
 Old pharmacy of Hedemora

References 

Populated places in Dalarna County
Municipal seats of Dalarna County
Swedish municipal seats
Populated places in Hedemora Municipality

fi:Hedemoran kunta